John O'Hara (12 September 1913 – 29 December 1983) was an Australian wrestler. He competed in the men's freestyle welterweight at the 1936 Summer Olympics.

References

External links
 

1913 births
1983 deaths
Australian male sport wrestlers
Olympic wrestlers of Australia
Wrestlers at the 1936 Summer Olympics
Sportspeople from Melbourne